Beginner's Luck may refer to:
 Beginner's luck, an expression
 Beginner's Luck (1935 film), an Our Gang short comedy film
 Beginner's Luck (2001 film), a British drama film